Savignac-Lédrier is a commune in the Dordogne department of Nouvelle-Aquitaine in southwestern France.

Geography
The commune is situated by the Auvézère river, and is surrounded by other communes including Saint-Cyr-les-Champagnes, Saint-Mesmin, Lanouaille and Payzac. The principal town (La Chapelle) and two villages (La Garanne and La Croix-Merle) are close to the town of Payzac. The town halls of Savignac-Lédrier and Payzac are only 700 m apart.

History
At the creation of the departments in 1790, the commune became a part of the Corrèze département. Three years later in 1793, it was attached to the Dordogne département.

Population

Sights
Château de Bard
Château de la Forge, 15th-19th century

See also
Communes of the Dordogne département

References

Communes of Dordogne
Arrondissement of Nontron